Sadura railway station is a railway station on the Northern railway network of India. It is the headquarters of Anantnag division of Northern Railway zone.

History

The station was built as part of the Jammu–Baramulla line megaproject, intending to link the Kashmir Valley with Jammu Tawi and the rest of the Indian rail network.

Location

Design
The station features Kashmiri wood architecture, with an intended ambiance of a royal court which is designed to complement the local surroundings to the station. Station signage is predominantly in Urdu and English. The IRCTC intends to build a hotel in close proximity to the site.

See also
Jammu–Baramulla line
Srinagar International Airport

References

 

Railway stations in Anantnag district
Firozpur railway division
Railway stations opened in 2008